Beautiful Days is the fifth studio album by Kyla. It was released by EMI Philippines on June 3, 2006. The album includes the single Beautiful Days written by Kyla herself with producer Jonathan Manalo inspired from her boyfriend Rich Alvarez and the main theme song of weekly TV series Now & Forever aired over GMA Network with the same title.

Track listing

See also
 Kyla discography

References

2006 albums
Kyla albums
Tagalog-language albums
EMI Records albums